Association Sportive Nigelec Basket Club, commonly known as Nigelec, is a basketball team based in Niamey, Niger. The team is owned by NIGELEC, a state-owned electric power generator company in the country. The team is nicknamed Électriciens (Electricians).

Representing Niger, the team participated in the qualifying tournaments for the 2021 and 2022 seasons. Under head coach Amadou Karimou, Nigelec successfully advanced from the Group Phase to the Elite 16 after ending in second place in Group B.

Arena

Games of AS Nigelec, as for other basketball teams in Niger, are usually played at the Palais de 29 Juillet (Palace of 29 July).

Honours
Coupe Du Président De La République
Champions: 2019

In African competitions
BAL Qualifiers (1 appearance)
2020 – Second Round

Players

Current roster
The following is the Nigelec roster in the 2022 BAL Qualifying Tournaments.

Notable players
Abdoulaye Harouna (2019–2020)

References

Basketball teams from Niger

Road to BAL teams
Sport in Niamey